Butler Grove Township (T9N R4W) is located in Montgomery County, Illinois, United States. As of the 2010 census, its population was 775 and it contained 374 housing units.

Geography

Demographics

Protected areas
 Arches Rail Trail

Adjacent townships
 Raymond Township (north)
 Rountree Township (northeast)
 Irving Township (east)
 East Fork Township (southeast)
 Hillsboro Township (south)
 South Litchfield Township (southwest)
 North Litchfield Township (west)
 Zanesville Township (northwest)

References

External links
City-data.com
Illinois State Archives
Historical Society of Montgomery County

Townships in Montgomery County, Illinois
1872 establishments in Illinois
Townships in Illinois